Vytautas Kairiūkštis (1890 in Sejny – 1961 in Vilnius) was a Lithuanian constructivist artist.

From 1910 to 1911 Kairiukstis  attended the Vilnius Drafting School.

In 1923 Kairiūkštis organised the New Art Exhibition which lasted from May 20 to June 20. In this he was aided by Władysław Strzemiński, who had moved to Vilnius the year before. This was the first avant-garde art exhibition in Lithuania and featured Cubist, Constructivist, and Suprematist works.

References

1890 births
1961 deaths
Constructivism (art)
Lithuanian painters
Imperial Moscow University alumni
Burials at Bernardine Cemetery